Hodgson is a surname. In Britain, the Hodgson surname was the 173rd most common (766 per million) in 1881 and the 206th most common (650 per million) in 1998. In the United States of America, Hodgson was the 3753rd most popular surname (30 per million) in the 1990 census.

Origin and meaning
Hodgson is a patronymic surname, thought by some to mean "son of Hodge", with Hodge being a Middle English personal name usually representing a pet-form of the name Roger. However, Geoffrey Hodgson shows that both distribution of the name and DNA suggest a Norse-Irish origin, making “son of Oddgeir” a more likely derivation.

Variants
The Hodson surname is less common and generally derives from Hodgson. Other probable variants of Hodgson include Hodgeson, Hodgshon, Hodshon, Hodgin, Hodgins, Hodgen, Hodgens, Hodghson, Hodgon and Hodgeon. In the North of England the "s" is often silent in the pronunciation of Hodgson. This accounts for variants such as Hodgin, Hodgen, Hodgon and Hodgeon.

Coat of arms
The Hodgsons of Hebburn, a mine-owning Catholic family living in the North East of England in the sixteenth and seventeenth centuries (Surtees 1820, vol. 2, pp. 77, 319, James 1974, Hodgson 2008), bore a heraldic coat of arms, blazoned as "per chevron, embattled or and azure, three martlets counterchanged". This same coat of arms is associated with several other Hodgson families, including the Hodgsons of West Keal in Lincolnshire, the Hodgsons of Bascodyke in Cumberland (Hodgson 1925), the Hodshons of Amsterdam, and with Thomas Hodgson (1738–1817) a Liverpool merchant and slave trader, and the owner of a mill in Caton, Lancashire (Hodgson 2008).

Border Reivers and Hodgson clans
For centuries before James VI's assentation to the throne of England (Union of the Crowns), the remote Anglo-Scottish borderland region had been the lair of unruly clans and gangs of robbers that were largely beyond the reach of the law. A peculiar form of clan organisation grew up in this area. This was the land of the Border Reivers. These clans had a legal system distinct from that of the majority of England and Scotland (Robb 2018). The suppression of this legal system led to a generalised breakdown of Reiver society (Robb 2018). They would steal goods, cattle and women from across the nominal border.

Some Hodgsons in Cumberland were themselves a clan organisation (Fraser 1971). The border clans were eventually subjection by state authorities. Many were forced or obliged to emigrate to North America in the 18th century (Fischer 1989). Many Hodgsons emigrated in this period.

People with the surname
 Alex Hodgson, Scottish singer/songwriter
 Andrew Hodgson (disambiguation)
 Arthur Hodgson (1818–1902), Australian pioneer and politician
 Brett Hodgson, Australian professional rugby league player 
 Brian Hodgson, British television composer and sound technician
 Brian Houghton Hodgson (1800–1894), British naturalist
 Bryan Hodgson, American college basketball coach
 Caroline Hodgson (1851–1908), Australian brothel proprietor
 Charles Hodgson (artist) (c. 1770 – 1856), amateur English landscape painter 
 Christopher Hodgson (disambiguation)
 Claire Merritt Hodgson (1897–1976), second wife of Babe Ruth
 Cody Hodgson (born 1990), Canadian professional ice hockey player
 David Hodgson (disambiguation)
 Derek Hodgson (disambiguation)
 Edward Hodgson (1813–1882), British clergyman and cricketer
 Edward Smith Hodgson (1866–1937), Scottish artist, etcher, and illustrator of magazines and of juvenile fiction
 Frances Hodgson Burnett, born Frances Eliza Hodgson (1849–1924), English–American playwright and author
 Francis Roger Hodgson (1853–1920), British clergyman and Bible translator
 Frederick Hodgson (disambiguation)
 Geoffrey Hodgson (born 1946), economist
 George Hodgson (disambiguation)
 Henrietta Mildred Hodgson (1805–1891), great-great-grandmother of Queen Elizabeth II
 Henry Hodgson (disambiguation)
 Herbert John Hodgson (1893–1974), soldier and printer of The Seven Pillars of Wisdom
 Isaac Hodgson (architect) (born 1826), Irish-US architect
 James Hodgson (disambiguation)
 Jane Elizabeth Hodgson (1915–2006), American obstetrician and gynecologist
 Joel Hodgson (born 1960), creator and former host of Mystery Science Theater 3000
 John Hodgson (disambiguation)
 Joseph Hodgson (1788–1869), British physician
 Jules Hodgson, English guitarist
 Julian Hodgson (born 1963), English chess grandmaster
 Ken Hodgson (1942–2007), English footballer from Newcastle.
 Laurence C. Hodgson (1874–1937), US newspaper writer and politician
 Leonard Hodgson (1889–1969), Anglican priest, philosopher, theologian, and historian
 Leyland Hodgson 1892–1949), American actor
 Lucy Hodgson, American sculptor and printmaker
 Marshall Hodgson (1922–1968), American Islamic scholar
 Martin Hodgson (1909–1991), English rugby league forward and goalkicker
 Matthew Hodgson (disambiguation)
 Miriam Hodgson (1938–2005), British editor of children's books
 Nick Hodgson (born 1977), English drummer and musician
 Patricia Hodgson, Principal of Newnham College, Cambridge
 Paul Hodgson (disambiguation)
 Peter Hodgson (disambiguation)
 Ralph Hodgson (1871–1962), English poet
 Randolph Hodgson (1870–1952), English clergyman and writer under the pen-name "A Country Vicar"
 Richard Hodgson (disambiguation)
 Robert Hodgson (disambiguation)
 Robert Willard Hodgson (1893–1966), an American botanist
 Robert MacLeod Hodgson (1874–1956), British diplomat
 Robin Hodgson, Baron Hodgson of Astley Abbotts (born 1942), British politician
 Roger Hodgson (born 1950), English singer/songwriter
 Shadworth Hodgson (1832–1912), English philosopher
 Sharon Hodgson (born 1966), British politician
 Sharyn Hodgson (born 1968), Australian actress who appeared in Home and Away
 Stuart Milton Hodgson (born 1924), Canadian commissioner
 Studholme Hodgson (1708–1798), British field marshal
 Sydney Hodgson (died 1591), English Roman Catholic lawyer and martyr
 Telfair Hodgson (1840–1893), American Episcopal priest and academic administrator
 Telfair Hodgson Jr. (1876–1952), American academic administrator, banker, developer
 Thomas Hodgson (disambiguation)
 Walter Joseph Hodgson (1924-1978) (Lt.Col, USAF, Retired) American Helicopter Test Pilot, one of only three men to fly the Avro Canada VZ-9 Avrocar, and the only two-time recipient of the Frederick L. Feinberg Memorial Award (1960, 1979)
 W. N. Hodgson (1893–1916), First World War poet who published under the pen name Edward Melbourne
 Wil Hodgson (born 1978), English stand-up comedian
 William Hodgson (disambiguation)

Sportspeople
 Arthur Hodgson (footballer) (born 1926), Australian rules footballer
 Aub Hodgson (1912–1982), Australian rugby union player
 Billy Hodgson (born 1935), Scottish footballer
 Brett Hodgson (born 1978), Australian rugby league player
 Charlie Hodgson (born 1980), rugby union player
 Cody Hodgson (born 1990), Canadian ice hockey player
 Dan Hodgson (born 1965), Canadian ice hockey player
 Dan Hodgson (cricketer) (born 1990), English cricketer
 Geoffrey Hodgson (cricketer) (born 1938), English cricketer
 Gordon Hodgson (1904–1951), South African-born English footballer, cricketer and baseball player
 Gordon Hodgson (footballer) (1952–1999), English footballer
 Isaac Hodgson (1828–1867), English cricketer
 Joe Hodgson (born 1988), 2012 British supermoto quad champion
 Martin Hodgson, English rugby league footballer
 Michael Hodgson (born 1979), Australian rugby league player
 Neil Hodgson, English motorcycle racer
 Nick Hodgson (swimmer) (born 1964), British swimmer
 Pat Hodgson (born 1944), US American football player
 Philip Hodgson (born 1935), English cricketer
 Rick Hodgson (born 1956), Canadian ice hockey player
 Robert Hodgson (cricketer) (born 1973), Australian cricketer
 Roy Hodgson (born 1947), English football manager
 Rusty Hodgson (born 1981), British motorcycle racer
 Ted Hodgson (born 1945), Canadian ice hockey player
 Tim Hodgson (born 1975), English cricketer

Fictional characters
 Tom Hodgson, a character from Channel Zero, portrayed by Brandon Scott

Hodgson can also be a given name:
Hodgson Pratt (1824–1907), English pacifist

References

Bibliography
 Fischer, David Hackett (1989) Albion's Seed: Four British Folkways in America (Oxford and New York: Oxford University Press).
 Fraser, George MacDonald (1971) The Steel Bonnets: The Story of the Anglo-Scottish Reivers (London: Barrie and Jenkins).
Antiquarian and Archaeological Society, New Series, 25, pp. 244–49.
 Hanks, Patrick, Richard Coates and Peter McClure, eds. (2016) The Oxford Dictionary of Family Names in Britain and Ireland, volume 2 (Oxford: Oxford University Press)
 Reaney, P. H. (1958) A Dictionary of English Surnames, first edition (London: Routledge and Kegan Paul).
 Robb, G. (2018). The Debatable Land: The Lost World Between Scotland and England (London: Picador)
 Surtees, Robert (1820) History and Antiquities of the County Palatine of Durham, volume 2 (London: Nichols).

English-language surnames
Surnames of English origin
Patronymic surnames